Charles Villar (January 1852 – 21 September 1877) was an Scotland international rugby union player.

Rugby Union career

Amateur career

Villar started his rugby career with Warriston.

Villar also played as a forward for Edinburgh Wanderers.

Provincial career

Villar represented Edinburgh District against Glasgow District in the 5 December 1874 match. He was listed as a Warriston rugby club player in this match.

International career

Villar represented Scotland in the 1875–76 Home Nations rugby union matches and 1876–77 Home Nations rugby union matches.

Villar's first international cap for Scotland was the England - Scotland match at The Oval on the 6 March 1876 match. This was the last 20-a-side international match. He had 2 other Scotland caps, against Ireland in February 1877 and against England in March 1877.

Military career

Villar served in the 1st Midlothian Rifle Volunteer Corps where he was a Lieutenant.

Family

Villar parents were James Villar and Mary Bridgewater and Charles had 6 brothers and 2 sisters. James Villar was an auctioneer and land agent.

References

1852 births
1877 deaths
Scottish rugby union players
Scotland international rugby union players
Rugby union forwards
Edinburgh District (rugby union) players
Edinburgh Wanderers RFC players
Rugby union players from Cheltenham
Warriston RFC players